Polionota is a genus of tephritid  or fruit flies in the family Tephritidae.

Species
Polionota beckeri Hering, 1953
Polionota fantastica Norrbom, 1988
Polionota kohnae Norrbom, 1988
Polionota magnipennis Hendel, 1914
Polionota mucida (Giglio-Tos, 1893)
Polionota parva Norrbom, 1988
Polionota radians Wulp, 1899
Polionota reedae Norrbom, 1988

References

Tephritinae
Tephritidae genera
Diptera of South America
Diptera of North America
Taxa named by Frederik Maurits van der Wulp